The Elan is a right tributary of the river Prut in Romania. It discharges into the Prut near Vădeni, on the border with Moldova.

Tributaries

The following rivers are tributaries to the river Elan:

Left: Recea, Huluba, Oița
Right: Grumezoaia, Cășla, Barboși, Mălăiești, Vutcani, Urdești, Jigălia, Mihona, Sărata

References

Rivers of Romania
Rivers of Vaslui County
Rivers of Galați County
Tributaries of the Prut